Jacques Swaters (30 October 1926 – 10 December 2010) was a racing driver from Belgium and former team owner of Ecurie Francorchamps and Ecurie Nationale Belge.

Racing career

Swaters made his debut in the 24 Hours of Spa in an MG co-driven by his friend and racer-turned-journalist Paul Frère, entered under the Ecurie Francorchamps banner. In 1950 Swaters, Frère and André Pilette established Écurie Belgique, a banner in which they prepared cars for themselves and other Belgian races, both in Grand Prix and sports car racing. Swaters himself raced a yellow Talbot-Lago in several events, including two World Championship rounds, the 1951 German and Italian Grands Prix.

However, in 1952, Swaters, another Belgian Charles de Tornaco and British driver Geoff Richardson, restarted Ecurie Francorchamps, a racing stable mainly associated with Ferrari. Swaters drove the team Ferrari 500 in a small number of events, but did manage to take a victory at the 1953 Avusrennen, a Formula 2 race. Richardson was signed to drive the prototype Zethrin Rennsport. As a driver, Swaters later concentrated on sports car racing, driving a Jaguar C-Type and a D-Type.

Team manager

After retiring from racing in 1957, Swaters became manager of the Ecurie Nationale Belge, which had been formed in 1955 as a merger of his Francorchamps, Frère's Ecurie Belgique and Johnny Claes' Ecurie Belge. The ENB entered several Cooper-Climax cars in Formula 2 racing for both experienced and upcoming Belgian drivers, and helped launch the career of Olivier Gendebien, Lucien Bianchi and Mauro Bianchi. The team moved into F1 in 1960 and later reworked the Emeryson into the ENB chassis.

However, by 1964 Swaters was no longer interested in ENB and had turned his attention to sports car racing completely. Swaters' Ecurie Francorchamps, which had remained independent from the ENB effort during the 1950s and 1960s, was always a top contender, with occasional class wins (including the 1965 24 Hours of Le Mans) and frequent class podiums. An overall victory at the 1965 500km Spa was Swaters' crowning achievement as a manager.

The Ecurie Francorchamps stopped operating in 1982, but Swaters retained his Garage Francorchamps, a Ferrari dealership.

Ferrari dealer and collector

Swaters, who had bought a Ferrari 500 Formula 2 car in 1952 for his racing team, was contacted in 1953 by Ferrari to resolve a problem with the local customs authority for the car they were to display at the Brussels Motor Show and was asked to take care of the Ferrari exhibition stand as well. He managed to get the car through customs as well as making a sale at the Motor Show. As a result, he was appointed as the official Ferrari importer for the Benelux the same year. This was the beginning of a relationship that was to last over 50 years and make Swaters one of the most important Ferrari dealers as well as a major collector of everything related to the brand.

In recognition of their long standing relationship, Ferrari unveiled the Ferrari 456 to the world at the Garage Francorchamps in 1992. At the same time the "Blue Swaters" was introduced by Ferrari as a colour to celebrate 40 years of partnership Ferrari-Swaters.

During his lifetime Jacques Swaters collected everything about Ferrari, original documentations, important vintage cars, sculptures, and other automobilia. With all these items he opened "the bunker" as he would call the Galleria Ferrari, an impressive collection in which feature a lot of gifts given personally by Enzo Ferrari, for example 1 of only 3 bronze crucifix crafted at Ferrari's foundery, on the occasion of the pope's visit to the Maranello factory, as well as a wooden sculpture of the Prancing Horse, that used to decorate Enzo Ferrari's personal office at Ferrari's Fiorano circuit. The collection also houses the only Ferrari four-door ever made, the "Pinin" prototype, the Ferrari GTO Evoluzione, a Ferrari California and other rare and important cars of the Italian brand.

Swaters last appearance in the sports car world was in an Ohio Courtroom where he was defending his possession of a very rare 1954 Ferrari 375 plus chassis 0384AM that was stolen from the U.S. collector Karl Kleve in the late 1980s. Swaters said that he rightfully bought the car as a burnt out chassis in 1990, and that he and Kleve settled its ownership in 1999.

In 2008 an aged Jacques Swaters decided to sell a large part of his impressive collection, at an auction in Maranello.

Complete World Championship Grand Prix results 
(key)

Sources
Profile at www.grandprix.com
 The Stolen Ferrari Story
 NPR – last voice interview with Swaters 2010

1926 births
2010 deaths
Belgian racing drivers
Belgian Formula One drivers
Ecurie Francorchamps Formula One drivers
Scuderia Filipinetti Formula One drivers
24 Hours of Le Mans drivers
World Sportscar Championship drivers
24 Hours of Spa drivers
Formula One team owners
Ferrari people
Sports car racing team owners
20th-century Belgian people